A ventriloquist practices ventriloquism.

The Ventriloquist may refer to:
Ventriloquist (comics), a DC comics villain
The Ventriloquist (album), a 2007/2008 album by Ruby Throat
The Ventriloquist, short film with Kevin Spacey, produced by Dana Brunetti

See also
 Ventriloquism (disambiguation)